Jamil Jivani (born October 24, 1987) is a Canadian radio host and non-practising lawyer. In 2020, he was appointed senior fellow for Diversity and Empowerment at the Macdonald-Laurier Institute, a conservative, libertarian think tank affiliated with the US Atlas Network. His association with the Institute ended in 2022. He sits on the Premier's Council on Equality of Opportunity and is the Advocate for Community Opportunities for the Doug Ford government. In July 2020, Jivani faced backlash for disparaging remarks he made about calls on Twitter to defund police, and for blaming some of the increase in gun violence on “young gangsters” and their online drama. He is the founder of the Policing Literacy Initiative, co-founder of Teachers Beyond the Classroom, and a 2014-15 articling student at Torys LLP.

Early life and education
Jivani was born in Toronto, Ontario and raised in the Greater Toronto Area. After attending Newman Creek Sr. Public School, Jivani attended Humber College and York University. In 2013 he earned his Juris Doctor from Yale Law School. Before attending law school, Jivani worked as a dishwasher and line cook in local Toronto area restaurants.

While a student at Yale, Jivani was Program Director of the Yale Chapter of the Marshall-Brennan Constitutional Literacy Project and President of the Yale Black Law Students Association. He was also part of the Innovations in Policing Clinic, in which he authored a case study of police-community relations in Milwaukee, Wisconsin. He contributed to the 2012 anthology, Jamaica in the Canadian Experience: A Multiculturalizing Presence, and has written about youth and equality issues for Huffington Post. At Yale, he was a classmate of J. D. Vance, author of Hillbilly Elegy.

Career
In 2013 Jivani founded the Policing Literacy Initiative (PLI), a youth-driven public education and advocacy group focused on community safety issues. Jivani stated to CBC Metro Morning that the purpose of PLI is to spotlight progressive voices among police and community groups and work with them to find common solutions. Jivani wrote an editorial for the National Post in February 2014 about his experience with Toronto Police and the Office of the Independent Police Review Director and the use of mediated conversations for citizen complaints. In March 2014 Jivani advocated for Toronto Police Services Board policy changes to police-community contacts and "carding." In April 2014 Jivani co-produced with Dan Epstein a documentary about police-community relations titled "Crisis of Distrust: Police and Community in Toronto."

Jivani was a 2013-14 Greater Toronto CivicAction Alliance DiverseCity Fellow. As a Fellow he co-founded Teachers Beyond the Classroom, which seeks to "help thousands of unemployed teachers transfer their skills to non-school employment opportunities across the Greater Toronto Area."  He currently serves on the Board of Directors of the Children's Aid Society of Toronto. On February 13, 2014, Jivani was named Yale Alumni Magazine's Newsmaker of the Week.
 
In 2019, Jivani published Why Young Men: The Dangerous Allure of Violent Movements and What We Can Do About It.

On December 11, 2019, the Government of Ontario appointed Jivani as the province's first Advocate for Community Opportunities. In this role, and as a Special Advisor to the Premier, Mr. Jivani will open lines of communications between communities and the government to empower community members and enable them to increase their participation in government decision-making.

On September 8, 2020, Bell Media announced that Jamil Jivani would host a new weekday nightly radio talk show 'Tonight with Jamil Jivani', from 10:00 PM - 11:00 PM. The show would air on NEWSTALK 1010 and across the iHeart Radio Network. 

In February 2021, Bell Media went under a corporate restructuring within its radio division. It was announced Jamil Jivani would move to the 7:00 PM - 10:00 PM time slot and his show would be rebranded as 'The Jamil Jivani Show'.  Jivani was later fired from Bell Media, which he claimed was due to him not conforming to black stereotypes. In August of 2022, Jamil Jivani sued Bell Media for wrongful dismissal and breach of contract.

References 

1987 births
Living people
People from Toronto
Yale Law School alumni
Humber College alumni
York University alumni